John Hansl (January 21, 1925 – June 29, 2007) entered the Nazi Waffen SS in 1943, aged eighteen.

Born Johann Hansl in Donji Miholjac, Yugoslavia, now part of Croatia, to ethnic German parents, he served as an armed SS Death's Head battalion guard of civilian prisoners at the Sachsenhausen concentration camp near Berlin, and later at the Natzweiler concentration camp in France.

After World War II, he moved to Austria. He emigrated to the United States in 1955 and was granted citizenship in 1960. He became a U.S. citizen in 1966. Later, his wife and family joined him.
On April 8, 2005, a federal court working with evidence obtained by the Office of Special Investigations, revoked his American citizenship because of his service as a Nazi concentration camp guard. The judge ruled that "regarding his personal conduct as a Death's Head guard leaves no room for factual dispute whether he personally advocated or assisted in persecution". The U.S. Court of Appeals for the Eighth Circuit affirmed the decision, and the U.S. Supreme Court refused to review the case.

Death
John Hansl died in a nursing home in Des Moines, Iowa, aged 82.

Reference links

External links
 Pittsburgh Tribune report on Hansl
 Website related to John Hansl
 Obituary of John Hansl

1925 births
2007 deaths
Sachsenhausen concentration camp personnel
People from Des Moines, Iowa
Loss of United States citizenship by prior Nazi affiliation
Yugoslav people of German descent
Yugoslav emigrants to Austria
Austrian emigrants to the United States